The Foster Park Bowl is an outdoor amphitheatre located between Ojai and Ventura, California. Built in 1928, it has a seating capacity of 1,000.

History
Ventura County pioneer and philanthropist Eugene Preston Foster initiated the idea of a county park system in 1904; the  Foster Park was established in 1908. The concrete amphitheatre began construction in the summer of 1928 and was dedicated on November 26, 1928.

The bowl was used frequently into the 1960s, but in the 1970s it saw less use as people started to shift to Libbey Bowl in Ojai. The bowl was occasionally used after the 1970s but fell into disrepair. An attempt to renovate Foster Park Bowl was mounted in 1988 by the Ventura County Repertory Theatre.

As of 2009, Teenagers for The Preservation of Historical Landmarks, a student group based at Foothill Technology High School, are working to get the necessary permits and release forms in order to go to the bowl and do an initial cleanup. The group is planning various fundraisers to pay for the stage to be reinforced, which a 2007 assessment stated would require $30,000 worth of work.

See also
 Ventura County Historic Landmarks & Points of Interest

References

Amphitheaters in California
Music venues in California
Theatres in California
Buildings and structures in Ventura, California
Parks in Ventura County, California
Event venues established in 1928
1928 establishments in California